Freeze! is the second extended play by South Korean girl group Momoland. It was released by Duble Kick Entertainment and distributed by Kakao M on August 22, 2017. For the extended play, Momoland worked with a variety of producers including Duble Sidekick, WiiKeed, Glory Face, Tenzo & Tasco, Yokan and Jake K. Freeze! consists of six tracks including the single "Freeze" and its instrumental, three other new tracks and the EDM version of the previously released single "Wonderful Love".

To promote the extended play, the group performed on several South Korean music show programs, such as M Countdown and Inkigayo. Commercially, the album peaked at number seventeen on South Korea's Gaon Album Chart.

Background and release
Momoland released their single album Wonderful Love featuring the lead single of the same name in April 2017. The single featured new members Daisy and Taeha. Following the release of "Wonderful Love", it was announced on August 8, 2017 the release of the group's second extended play. Prior to the release, teasers featuring photos of Momoland from the extended play's photoshoot, a snippet of the extended play and clips from music video of "Freeze" were released online in August 2017.

The extended play was officially released on August 22, 2017 by Duble Kick Entertainment and distributed by Kakao M as the group's third extended play, with "Freeze" serving as the lead single.

Commercial performance
In South Korea, the extended play debuted and peaked at number seventeen on the Gaon Album Chart for the week of August 27, 2017. It was the sixty-third best-selling album for the month August 2017 with 2,234 physical copies sold.

Track listing

Charts

Credits and personnel
Credits adapted from Melon.
 Momoland – vocals 
 1Take – lyricist , composer 
 The Cannels – composer 
 Duble Sidekick – lyricist , composer 
 Glory Face – composer , arrangement 
 Seong Hyeon Bae – lyricist 
 Jake K – composer , arrangement 
 Jinli – lyricist , composer 
 JQ – lyricist 
 Kim Su Jeong – lyricist 
 Long Candy – lyricist , composer 
 Myo – arrangement 
 Tenzo & Tasco – lyricist , composer 
 WiiKeed – composer , arrangement 
 Yokan – composer , arrangement

Release history

References

Momoland albums
2017 EPs
Korean-language EPs
Kakao M EPs